The Korea Journal is a quarterly peer-reviewed academic journal covering Korean studies. It was established in 1961 and is published by the Academy of Korean Studies. The editor-in-chief is Myoun-hoi Do (Daejeon University). The journal is abstracted and indexed in the Arts and Humanities Citation Index.

See also
The Journal of Korean Studies
Korean Studies

References

External links

English-language journals
Publications established in 1961
Quarterly journals
Korean studies journals